"X Si Volvemos" (Spanish for "If We Return") is a song by Colombian singer-songwriter Karol G and American singer Romeo Santos. It was written by Giraldo, Santos, Ovy on the Drums, Nesty, Wisin, Yandel and Kevyn Cruz and produced by Drums. The song was released on February 2, 2023 through Universal Music Latino, as the fourth single from her fourth studio album, Mañana Será Bonito.

Background
The song was announced on January 31, 2023, through Karol G's social media platforms with the title and Santo's inclusion. The song was released on February 2, 2023.

According to Rolling Stone, Karol G had already recorded the song before adding Santos to the verse.

Commercial performance
On the US Billboard Hot 100 chart dated February 18, 2023, the song debuted at number 56. On the week of March 11, 2023, during its fourth week charting and release of its parent album, Mañana Será Bonito, the song reached a new peak of 48.

On the US Billboard Hot Latin Songs chart dated February 18, 2023, the song debuted at number 5. On the chart dated March 11, 2023, the song reached a new peak of number 4.

On the Billboard Global 200 the song debuted at number 30 on the chart dated February 18, 2023. On it’s fourth week on the chart dated March 11, 2023, the song reached a peak of number 18, becoming Giraldo's sixth top twentieth and Santo's second overall entry on the chart.

Charts

Monthly charts

Certifications

References

Karol G songs
Romeo Santos songs
Song recordings produced by Ovy on the Drums
Songs written by Karol G
Spanish-language songs